Established in 1985, Pediatric Neurology is a peer-reviewed medical journal that emphasizes the neurological disorders of children and adolescents. Published monthly by Elsevier, the journal publishes original research articles, topical reviews, short clinical reports, and short commentaries. Articles in Pediatric Neurology are available in both print and electronic formats, and proofs are available online soon after acceptance.

The editor-in-chief of Pediatric Neurology is E. Steve Roach, MD, of The University of Texas Dell Medical School in Austin, Texas (https://dellmed.utexas.edu/). The journal has a distinguished international editorial board.  According to the Journal Citation Reports, the journal's 2019 impact factor was 2.890.

External links
s

Elsevier academic journals
Publications established in 1985
Neurology journals
Pediatrics journals
English-language journals
Monthly journals